Trichopepla is a genus of stink bugs in the family Pentatomidae. There are about six described species in Trichopepla.

Species
These six species belong to the genus Trichopepla:
 Trichopepla atricornis Stal, 1872
 Trichopepla aurora Van Duzee, 1918
 Trichopepla dubia (Dallas, 1851)
 Trichopepla grossa
 Trichopepla semivittata (Say, 1832)
 Trichopepla vandykei Van Duzee, 1918

References

Further reading

External links

 

Pentatomidae genera
Articles created by Qbugbot
Pentatomini